The Central Zone (Portuguese: Zona Central de São Paulo) is an administrative zone of the city of São Paulo, Brazil.

One of the largest commercial and business districts in South America, the region is administered by the subprefecture of Sé. It is not concurrent, although often confused, with the regions known as Centro Expandido ("Expanded Center"), a broader area used by the city government for urban planning and road space rationing actions and Centro Histórico de São Paulo ("São Paulo Historic Center"), which, as the name implies, includes only the oldest part of the central region.

Limits 

Officially, the central area is bounded by districts of Municipality Cathedral. However, the social perception of what is called "center of São Paulo" varies and may include other areas of city. Until the creation of the administrative office of the Cathedral, the notion of "center" was equivalent to the region of the former administration regional office, who also included the districts of Brás and Pari,  currently covered by a Municipality of Mooca. The concept of a central area of São Paulo, however, is wider depending on the study is done about the region and may include items such as financial centers Paulista Avenue and Berrini.

Social Characteristics 

According to the 2000 census, the total population of the area is 374,002 inhabitants, including the neighborhoods and districts of Sé itself, Bela Vista, Bom Retiro, Cambuci, Consolação, Aclimação, Brás, Liberdade, República and Santa Cecília. It is the least populated administrative region in the city, albeit one with a wider range of public facilities and jobs. The average income in the area is R$ 2335.54, and each year the central area of São Paulo has a rate negative of population growth that reaches 5% per year, according to IBGE and SEADE statistics.

This factor contributed to what has been called degradation the region, as some experts in urban studies, with the removal of the São Paulo elite of the central areas, occurs along the removal of public stewardship, leading to a sense of abandonment. Despite showing an average income higher than that of other regions of the city, it has many homeless individuals and pockets of poverty, such as the region known as Cracolândia (lit. "Crackland"), which has recently been undergoing a controversial process of revitalization by the city government, accused of promoting "social hygiene" through gentrification.

The Centro region is the most well-served by public transportation, with four of the five Metrô subway lines operating in the area, along with several CPTM commuter rail lines. It is also home to some of the major institutions of higher education in the city, as Mackenzie University, The Armando Alvares Penteado Foundation (FAAP) and units of the University of São Paulo (USP), like Law School, The University Center on Maria Antonia Street, and the headquarters of the USP Post-Graduate School of Architecture and Urban Affairs.

Key points

Viaducts 

Chá Viaduct
Santa Ifigênia Viaduct
Anhangabaú Square

Avenue and Streets 

Prestes Maia Avenue
Tiradentes Avenue
Brigadeiro Luís Antônio Avenue
Liberdade Avenue
Estado Avenue
São João Avenue
Ipiranga Avenue
Rio Branco Avenue
23 de Maio Avenue
9 de Julho Avenue
Angélica Avenue
Paulista Avenue
Conselheiro Furtado Street
15 de Novembro Street
Rua 25 de Março
Porto Geral Alley
Consolação Street
Augusta Street
Maria Antonia Street
Dona Veridiana Street
Higienópolis Avenue
Carmo Street
Vergueiro Street

Squares 

Praça da Sé
Praça da República
Praça Doutor João Mendes
Praça Ramos de Azevedo
Pátio do Colégio
Largo do Arouche
Largo São Bento
Largo do Paiçandu
Largo de São Francisco
Largo da Misericórdia

Metro and commuter railway stations 

Metro Stations
Line 1 (Blue)
Vergueiro
São Joaquim
Liberdade
Sé
São Bento
Luz
Tiradentes
Armênia
Line 2 (Green)
Consolação
Trianon-Masp
Brigadeiro
Line 3 (Red)
Pedro II
Sé
Anhangabaú
República
Santa Cecília
Marechal Deodoro
Line 4 (Yellow)
Luz
República
Higienópolis-Mackenzie
Paulista
CPTM commuter railway stations
Line 7 (Ruby), Line 10 (Turquoise) and Line 11 (Coral)
Luz
Line 8 (Diamond)
Júlio Prestes

Major Shopping Centers 

Shopping Light
Shopping Frei Caneca
Shopping Paulista
Shopping Pátio Higienópolis

Major Parks 

Jardim da Luz
Parque da Aclimação
Parque Dom Pedro II

Colleges and universities 

Escola de Administração de Empresas de São Paulo – Fundação Getúlio Vargas (EAESP/FGV)
Universidade Presbiteriana Mackenzie
Faculdade de Direito da Universidade de São Paulo (FDUSP) – USP
Faculdade de Ciências Médicas da Santa Casa de São Paulo (FCMSCSP)
Centro de Ciências Exatas e Tecnologia – Pontifícia Universidade Católica de São Paulo – (CCET/PUC-SP)
Fundação Armando Alvares Penteado (FAAP)
Escola da Cidade (AEAUSP)
Liceu de Artes e Ofícios de São Paulo (LAO-SP)
Faculdade de Tecnologia de São Paulo (FATEC-SP)
Conservatório Dramático e Musical de São Paulo (CDMSP)
Universidade Livre de Música – Centro de Estudos Musicais Tom Jobim

Hospitals 

Hospital Samaritano
Hospital Santa Catarina
Irmandade da Santa Casa de Misericórdia de São Paulo (ISCMSP)
Hospital Nove de Julho
Hospital Sírio-Libanês
Hospital Alemão Oswaldo Cruz
Beneficência Portuguesa de São Paulo

Culture and Leisure 

Mário de Andrade Library
Theatro Municipal
São Paulo Museum of Art (MASP)
Museum of the Portuguese Language
Sala São Paulo
Pinacoteca do Estado
Museu de Arte Saca
Sociedade Brasileira de Cultura Japonesa

Rivers 

Tamanduateí River

Buildings 
Major buildings in the central zone of São Paulo:

Sightseeing 

Torre Banespa ("Banespa Tower"), situated on the highest point of the Altino Arantes Building and Edifício Itália are the main sightseeing places in the region and São Paulo as a whole, providing a privileged views of the city with a range of up to 40 kilometers, making it possible to see other city landmarks such as the Mercado Municipal, the São Paulo Cathedral, Edifício Copan and even Serra da Cantareira at distance. Mirante do Vale Building, completed in 1960, although not well known as a sightseeing place due to its location at the bottom of a valley, is still the tallest building in Brazil.

Panorama

See also 

Central Business Districts
List of central business districts
São Paulo

References

External links 
Subprefeitura Sé
Mirante do Vale
Visitation on the building, the site of Santander Banespa Bank
Information about the bank and the Altino Arantes Building
About the Building Banespa in Sampacentro Site
 Articles and information on the Edifício Itália site in Sampacentro Site

 
Financial districts
Tourist attractions in São Paulo